These are the Canadian number-one country songs of 2000, per the RPM Country Tracks chart.

Note that RPM ceased publication in November 2000.

See also
2000 in music
List of number-one country singles of 2000 (U.S.)

References
Notes

Citations

External links
 Read about RPM Magazine at the AV Trust
 Search RPM charts here at Library and Archives Canada

2000 in Canadian music
Canada Country
2000